Cyrtanthus falcatus, the falcate fire lily, is a species of flowering plant in the amaryllis family Amaryllidaceae from the Natal region of South Africa. These bear umbels of 8-10 narrowly-flared, pendulous tubular flowers in shades of red, green and cream in spring and summer. The umbels are bent over in a curious crook or sickle shape (hence The Latin specific epithet falcatus, “shaped like a sickle”). The plant goes dormant in winter. The bulb, shaped like a bowling pin, rests with its neck above the soil line.

Habitat
It is probably pollinated by sunbirds.

Cultivation
The plant is not frost-hardy, but may be grown outdoors in a warm, sheltered location in temperate regions. Alternatively it may be grown under glass, with bright filtered sunlight. In cultivation in the UK, C. falcatus has gained the Royal Horticultural Society’s Award of Garden Merit (confirmed 2017)

References

Amaryllidoideae